The ornate chorus frog (Pseudacris ornata) is a species of chorus frog endemic to the Southeastern United States. Their distribution ranges from North Carolina, east to the very eastern part of Louisiana, and south to northern parts of Florida (Castellon et al., 2014).

Description
Its color varies depending on locale: some are green, others red or brown. It typically has a defined but broken stripe or spots leading from the nose down the side. The frog’s upper lip is marked with a clear light colored line and many individuals have a faded triangle marking on the very top of the head (Mount, 1975). It has a pure white belly, and usually has yellow spots located in front of the hind legs.

Habitat
Most commonly found in the Southern coastal plain. The ornate chorus frog is typically found in xeric habitats, including pine stands, sandhills, and pine savannahs. Woodland ponds, flooded fields, and roadside ditches can serve as breeding habitat, although ponds found within sandhills, and pine forests or plantations observe the most breeding. A site with an open canopy and herbaceous vegetation is also common for breeding. These frogs require seasonally flooded wetlands without fish for a three to four month period for tadpoles to develop completely (Goff et al., 2020).

Behavior
These chorus frogs are nocturnal and are rarely seen, except during mating season. They become more active as the temperature begins to decrease and begin migrating toward water for the mating season. Most observations of this frog are on winter nights during or after rain. Because of this, little is known about the adult ornate chorus frog. They spend the remainder of the spring and summer waiting out the warm temperatures in burrows, under logs, or buried under sandy soil (Caldwell, 1987).

They are a fossorial species that uses their forelimbs in order to burrow into the substrate. This is a unique behavior because most burrowing frogs will dig backwards with their hind limbs. One study suggests that this method of forward burrowing may have evolved to facilitate subterranean feeding. They prefer to burrow in easily penetrated sandy soils and will occasionally communicate underground through vocalizations.

Predator and prey relationships 
Ornate chorus frogs are insectivores, eating small insects and larvae, as well as worms and other small invertebrates. These frogs are prey mainly to snakes, but also birds and sometimes raccoons. Because the ornate chorus frog is most active during the winter months, they are able to avoid many snake predators due to them already beginning their hibernation. The eggs and tadpoles can be preyed upon by fish, which is why these frogs prefer ephemeral ponds and wetlands to breed and lay their eggs Their dark markings and tendency for body coloring to vary depending on their habitat allows them a layer of camouflage as a defense tactic. However, even with this defense mechanism it has been observed that these frogs rarely live for longer than one to two breeding cycles because of predation. Adult mortality may also be due to intraspecies fighting (Caldwell, 1987). 

== Reproduction ==
Ornate chorus frogs reach sexual maturity around 1 year and reproduce through external fertilization. The female releases eggs at the same time that the male releases sperm and to ensure that the eggs are fertilized, they will sit in an axillary amplexus position. Eggs are laid in clusters ranging from 10 to 100 eggs attached to submerged vegetation. The eggs are abandoned after and neither parent provides any type of parental care to the eggs or hatched tadpoles. The eggs hatch between 1 and 2 weeks but hatch time is temperature dependent; colder temperatures indicate a longer period before hatching. After hatching, tadpoles have two yellow stripes on the sides of a dark back, as well as a high tail fin. Some may have a bicolored tail (Mount 1975). It can take between two and four months for tadpoles to fully develop into frogs, with development time also being temperature dependent (Goff et al., 2020).

Taxonomy
The ornate chorus frog (Pseudacris ornata) was named and classified by American herpetologist John Edwards Holbrook in 1836.

Etymology
The name of the genus, Pseudacris, comes from the Greek pseudes (false) and akris (locust), probably a reference to the repeated rasping trill of most chorus frogs, which is similar to that of the insect. The specific name, ornata, is the feminine form of the Latin adjective, ornatus (decorated).

References
3. Caldwell, J. P. (1987). Demography and Life History of Two Species of Chorus Frogs (Anura: Hylidae) in South Carolina. Copeia, 1987(1), 114–127. https://doi.org/10.2307/1446044.

4. Goff, C. B., Walls, S. C., Rodriguez, D., & Gabor, C. R. (2020). Changes in physiology and microbial diversity in larval ornate chorus frogs are associated with habitat quality. Conservation physiology, 8(1), coaa047. https://doi.org/10.1093/conphys/coaa047.

5. Mount, R. H. (1975). The reptiles and amphibians of Alabama. Auburn Printing Co., Auburn, Alabama.

6. Castellon, T. D., Enge, K. M., Farmer, A. L., Hill, E. P., Mays, J. D., Moler, P. E. (2014). Survey of Winter-Breeding Amphibian Species. Final Report. Florida Fish and Wildlife Conservation Commission. Fish and Wildlife Research Institute, Wildlife Research Section, Gainesville, p. 136.

Chorus frogs
Frogs of North America
Amphibians of the United States
Endemic fauna of the United States
Fauna of the Southeastern United States
Taxa named by John Edwards Holbrook
Amphibians described in 1836